The Fiscal Information Agency (FIA) is an agency of the Ministry of Finance of the Taiwan (ROC).

History
FIA was originally established as Financial and Taxation Data Processing and Examination Center in 1968. It was later integrated to the Ministry of Finance in 1970 and renamed to Financial Data Center in 1987. It was finally renamed to Fiscal Information Agency in 2013.

Organizational structure

Divisions
 Comprehensive Planning Division
 Taxation and Collection Division
 Information and Communication Division
 National Taxes Division
 Local Tax Division
 Data Processing Division
 Support Service Division

Offices
 Secretariat
 Accounting Office
 Personnel Office
 Civil Service Ethics Office

Transportation
The FIA office is accessible within walking distance East from Sun Yat-sen Memorial Hall Station of the Taipei Metro.

See also
 Ministry of Finance (Taiwan)

References

External links

 

2013 establishments in Taiwan
Executive Yuan
Government of Taiwan